Several annual festivals are celebrated at different levels in the Banaras Hindu University (BHU).

Official festivals 
Apart from the three national day festivals, the following festivals are celebrated at an official level in the university:

Other festivals 
Some other festivals celebrated in the Banaras Hindu University at a non-official, students' level include:

 Holi Milan Samaroh is celebrated each year outside Vishwanath Temple.
 Janmashtami celebrations are held each year. Jhaanki (Tableaus) are prepared by students celebrating the birth of Lord Krishna.
 Diwali Mahotsav are held each year, during which students light-up the campus, hostels, etc. with diyas.
 Guru Nanak Jayanti, Dev Deepawali,etc. are also celebrated by students.

See also 

 Banaras Hindu University
 Banaras Hindu University Kulgeet
 List of vice-chancellors of Banaras Hindu University

References 

Lists of festivals in India
Banaras Hindu University